John Thomas Glowrey (24 May 1856 – 12 June 1921) was an Australian politician who served as a member of the Legislative Council of Western Australia from 1900 to 1904 and again from 1906 to 1912.

Glowrey was born in Victoria, to Eliza (née Barry) and James Glowrey. He came to Western Australia in 1893, during the gold rushes, and settled in Coolgardie, where he was a publican. He served as mayor of the Coolgardie Municipality from 1897 to 1898. Glowrey was elected to parliament in September 1900, winning a four-year term in South Province. He was defeated by William Oats at the 1904 election, but returned to parliament in 1906 and served another six-year term before retiring. While in parliament, Glowrey had moved to Perth, where he leased the Palace Hotel from John De Baun. He held the lease until his death in 1921 (aged 65), which occurred while he was at the hotel. Glowrey had married twice, having five children by his first wife and four by his second.

References

1856 births
1921 deaths
Australian hoteliers
Mayors of places in Western Australia
Members of the Western Australian Legislative Council
People from Victoria (Australia)